Russell Mitchell may refer to:

Russell Mitchell (footballer), former Australian rules footballer
Russell Mitchell (gymnast), American Olympic gymnast
Russ Mitchell, American journalist
Russ Mitchell (baseball), former Major League Baseball player